"I See Fire" song by Ed Sheeran from The Hobbit: The Desolation of Smaug 

"I See Fire", Mairead Carlin, Máiréad Nesbitt from the album Celtic Woman: Destiny